Mostovoi or Mostovoy (from мост meaning bridge) is a Russian masculine surname, its feminine counterpart is Mostovaya. It may refer to
Aleksandr Mostovoi (born 1968), Russian football player
Andrei Mostovoy (born 1997), Russian football player
Artem Mostovyi (born 1983), Ukrainian football player
Ruslan Mostovyi (born 1974), Ukrainian football player
Sergey Mostovoy (1908–1979), Red Army private and Hero of the Soviet Union

Russian-language surnames